Hermann Schulz (24 August 1872 – 20 August 1929) was a German social democratic politician, a member of the Weimar National Assembly and the Weimar German parliament.

Schulz was born in Elbing, West Prussia (Elbląg, Poland). He was trained as a metal worker and worked as a lathe operator in Berlin from 1900 to 1911. He moved back to Elbing in 1911 where he worked for the German Metal Workers' Union.
During World War I Schulz served in the German Army from 2 August 1914 to 2 December 1918. On 1 December 1919 he became secretary of the Social Democratic Party in Elbing and from 1 July 1921 on he held the same position in Königsberg in East Prussia.
He served as a member of the town council of Elbing from 1913 to 1919 and was elected a member of the Weimar National Assembly on 19 January 1919 representing East Prussia. From December 1923 until his death in 1929 he was a member of the Weimar German parliament.

References

1872 births
1929 deaths
People from Elbląg
People from West Prussia
Social Democratic Party of Germany politicians
Members of the Reichstag of the Weimar Republic
Members of the Weimar National Assembly